The following is a timeline of the presidency of Joe Biden during the second quarter of 2022, from April 1 to June 30, 2022. To navigate between quarters, see timeline of the Joe Biden presidency.

Timeline

April 2022

May 2022

June 2022

See also
 Presidential transition of Joe Biden
 List of executive actions by Joe Biden
 List of presidential trips made by Joe Biden (international trips)
 Timeline of the 2020 United States presidential election

References

2022 Q2
Presidency of Joe Biden
April 2022 events in the United States
May 2022 events in the United States
June 2022 events in the United States
Political timelines of the 2020s by year
2022 timelines
Articles containing video clips